The Affairs of Dobie Gillis is a  1953 American comedy musical film directed by Don Weis. The film is based on the short stories by Max Shulman collected as The Many Loves of Dobie Gillis (also the title of the later TV series). Bobby Van played Gillis in this musical version, co-starring with Debbie Reynolds and Bob Fosse.

The movie was filmed in black and white, MGM's first non-color musical film in years. It was Fosse's technical screen debut, as it was his second film but the first to be released.

Plot
At Grainbelt University, a Midwestern university, freshmen Dobie Gillis (Bobby Van) and Charlie Trask (Bob Fosse) court coeds Pansy Hammer (Debbie Reynolds) and Lorna Ellingboe (Barbara Ruick). They attend the same courses because Lorna is pursuing Dobie, who is pursuing Pansy, and Charlie is pursuing Lorna. Pansy is studious, and is encouraged by her father George (Hanley Stafford) to "learn learn learn" and "work work work," while Dobie, Charlie and Lorna only want to have fun.

Pansy's father can't stand Dobie and does everything in his power to keep them apart. Dobie and Pansy manage to blow up the chemistry lab, but Dobie is spared expulsion because the officious English professor Pomfritt (Hans Conried) is misled to believe that the feckless Gillis is a literary genius.

Pansy is sent to a school in New York after the chemistry lab incident. With the help of Charlie and Lorna, Dobie figures out a way of getting Pansy back to Grainbelt.

Cast
 Bobby Van as Dobie Gillis, a freshman
 Debbie Reynolds as Pansy Hammer
 Bob Fosse as Charlie Trask, a freshman
 Barbara Ruick as Lorna
 Hans Conried as Prof. Pomfritt
 Hanley Stafford as George Hammer,  Pansy's father
 Lurene Tuttle as Mrs. Eleanor Hammer
 Charles Lane as Chemistry Professor Obispo
 Archer MacDonald as Harry Dorcas
 Kathleen Freeman as 'Happy Stella' Kowalski
 Almira Sessions as Aunt Naomi
 Charles Halton as Dean (Granbelt University)

Production
Carleton Carpenter was tentatively cast in the film, along with Reynolds, Van and Ruick, after MGM bought Shulman's stories. The original plan was to turn the film into a series, along the lines of the Andy Hardy and Dr. Kildare movie franchise, if the film was successful.

The film was Bob Fosse's film debut, released before Give a Girl a Break,  which was filmed previously.

According to MGM records the film earned $423,000 in the US and Canada and $154,000 elsewhere, resulting in a loss of $131,000.

Critical reaction 
At the time of release, a Philadelphia Inquirer reviewer called the film "agreeable" and cited Van's "rubber-legged grace, reminiscent of Ray Bolger. The Los Angeles Times called it a "lightweight, lightheaded comedy," and said the Max Shulman screenplay "is, shall we say, charitably, innocuous,"

The Pittsburgh Post-Gazette called the film "a small musical" that was "hung on the weakest imaginable plot," and said that it was "an insignificant piece of fluff" that was "hardly up to the standards of its principals, all of whom seem entirely too attractive and talented to be bothering with such nonsense." But the review credited the actors and director with nevertheless pulling off "a presentable entertainment." The film was playing Pittsburgh as a double feature with Tarzan and the She-Devil.

More recently, an Allmovie review criticized the film's "desperate, artificial perkiness -- the kind of Hollywood-derived energy that annoys by its phoniness." The review goes on to say "Ultimately, though, the trite (and often unbelievable) situations, lame jokes, and banal dialogue overwhelm the good will that the musical numbers engender. Extremely undemanding audiences, or those with a very strong nostalgic bent for the good old days, may enjoy The Affairs of Dobie Gillis, but most are advised to give it a pass."

Legacy 
Bob Fosse's biographers have dismissed the film, his movie acting debut, as "a minor-league comedy with a few old songs thrown in" and as  "a movie destined to achieve a Zenlike oblivion."

In the "You Can't Do Wrong Doin' Right" number, choreographed by Alex Romero, Fosse displays the explosive style for which he later became known. In his book Big Deal: Bob Fosse and Dance in the American Musical, author Kevin Winkler observes that while Bobby Van tap dances as well as Fosse in that number, Van "dances only with his feet while Fosse dances with his whole body."

Fosse was disillusioned by his experience making Dobie Gillis and Give a Girl a Break, which was filmed earlier but released after Dobie Gillis. Noting that his screen time was far less in Dobie than in the other film, Fosse later remarked, "My parts were getting smaller. I knew what that meant."

Songs
 "You Can't Do Wrong Doin' Right"
 Written by Al Rinker and Floyd Huddleston
 Performed by Barbara Ruick, Bob Fosse, Debbie Reynolds and Bobby Van
 "I'm Thru with Love"
 Music by Matty Malneck and Fud Livingston
 Lyrics by Gus Kahn
 Performed by Bobby Van
 "All I Do Is Dream of You"
 Music by Nacio Herb Brown
 Lyrics by Arthur Freed
 Performed by Debbie Reynolds and Bobby Van
 Played during the opening credits and often throughout the picture
 "Believe Me, If All Those Endearing Young Charms"
 Traditional Irish folk song, with lyrics by Thomas Moore
 Performed by Debbie Reynolds and Barbara Ruick
 "Red River Valley (song)"
 Traditional
 Played by the band during the square dance

References

External links
 
 
 
 
 The Affairs of Dobie Gillis at FANDANGO

1953 films
1953 musical comedy films
American musical comedy films
Films based on short fiction
Films directed by Don Weis
Films set in universities and colleges
Metro-Goldwyn-Mayer films
The Many Loves of Dobie Gillis
Films based on multiple works of a series
American black-and-white films
1950s English-language films
1950s American films